Xudaverdili is a village in the Jabrayil District of Azerbaijan.
 It was occupied by Armenian forces in 1993. The Azerbaijani Army recaptured the village during the 2020 Nagorno-Karabakh war.

References

Populated places in Jabrayil District